Middelburg is a city and municipality in the south-western Netherlands serving as the capital of the province of Zeeland. Situated on the central peninsula of the Zeeland province, Midden-Zeeland (consisting of former islands Walcheren, Noord-Beveland and Zuid-Beveland), it has a population of about 48,000.

In terms of technology, Middelburg played a role in the Scientific Revolution at the early modern period. The town was historically a center of lens crafting in the Golden Age of Dutch science and technology. The invention of the microscope and telescope is often credited to Middelburg spectacle-makers (including Zacharias Janssen and Hans Lippershey) in the late 16th century and early 17th century.

History 

The city of Middelburg dates back possibly to the late 8th century or early 9th century. The first mention of Middelburg was as one of three fortified towns (borgs) erected on Walcheren (then an island) to guard against Viking raids. In 844 a monastery was built on the site, which remained an active Catholic foundation until the Reformation. Foundations for Middelburg's "stately and picturesque" main church were first laid in the 10th century; additional construction continued through the Middle Ages.

Middelburg was granted city rights in 1217. During the Middle Ages, it became an important trading centre in the commerce between England and the rising cities of Flanders, a fact commented on by Geoffrey Chaucer in The Canterbury Tales. The town continued to gain in power and prestige during the 13th and 14th centuries.

From 1559 to 1603, Middelburg was the episcopal see of a Catholic bishopric covering all Zeeland. In the Eighty Years' War, the city was captured by Dutch rebels from the Spanish forces during a long siege (1572–1574). The northern provinces of the Low Countries won their independence from their former Spanish Habsburg rulers and formed the Dutch Republic, a Protestant state. Later, during the 17th century (the Dutch Golden Age), Middelburg became, after Holland's metropolis Amsterdam, the most important center for the Dutch East India Company (VOC) in the Republic of the Seven United Netherlands. As such, Middelburg also played an important role in the 17th century slave trade.

Samuel Ben Israel, son of Menasseh Ben Israel, is buried in Middelburg at the Sephardic burial site located at the 'Jodengang' outside the citywall. Menasseh Ben Israel negotiated with Cromwell the opening of England, and its colonies, to the Jews. In 1994 the synagogue was restored, as it was partially destroyed during the Second World War. This synagogue was the third one to be built in the Netherlands during the Golden Age. In the hall of the railway station there is a plaque of remembrance for the Jews of Zeeland who started their journey to the death camps from the Middelburg train station.

About a third of the old city centre was devastated by bombs and fire in the early phases of World War II, on May 17, 1940. It is still not certain if German bombers or French artillery were responsible. The town was captured and liberated by British troops during Operation Infatuate on 6 November 1944. After the War, as much of the destroyed part of the old town center was rebuilt and restored along pre-War lines as far as was possible. The city's archives, however, had been incinerated during the German bombardment.

Modern Middelburg has preserved and regained much of its historic and picturesque character. There are lavish 17th and 18th century merchant houses and storehouses standing along canals, of a similar style as found in cities like Amsterdam. The old city moats are still there, as are two of the city gates, the Koepoort Gate and the varkenspoort Gate. Part of the 18th century moat and defence works, however, were demolished in the 19th century to make way for a commercial canal that crosses Walcheren from Vlissingen to Veere. The medieval abbey is still in use today, as a museum and as the seat of the provincial government.

Notable locals 

Ambrosius Bosschaert the Elder (1573–1621) was a still life painter of the Dutch Golden Age who worked most of his life in Middelburg. He had three sons, Johannes Bosschaert (1606/08– 1628/29), Ambrosius Bosschaert II (1609–1645) and Abraham Bosschaert the Younger (1612–1643) who were all Dutch Golden Age painters. 
 
The painter Pieter Gaal, (1769–1819) was born, settled and died here, after traveling over Europe to paint.

Another well-known citizen of Middelburg was the admiral and explorer Jacob Roggeveen, who was born in the city in 1659 and died there in 1729. Roggeveen discovered Easter Island (Rapa Nui) in the South Pacific Ocean on Easter Sunday, April 6, 1722. Further discoveries on the same journey included islands of the Tuamotu group, now part of French Polynesia.

Petronella Johanna de Timmerman, scientist and poet, was born here in 1723. In 1774 she was inducted as an honorary member of the academy Kunstliefde Spaart Geen Vlijt. Also, she presented the academy with poems, translated from French plays. She died in Utrecht in 1786.

The arts 
 Hortensia del Prado (? - 1627), a Dutch horticulturalist and noblewoman
Adrianus Valerius (ca.1575 – 1625), a Dutch poet and composer
 Jacob van Geel (ca.1585 – 1648), a Dutch Golden Age painter. 
 Christoffel van den Berghe (ca.1590 – ca.1645), a Dutch Golden Age painter of landscapes 
 Balthasar van der Ast (1593/94 – 1657), a Dutch Golden Age painter
 Pieter de Putter (ca.1600 – 1659), a Dutch still life painter
 Daniël de Blieck (ca.1610 – 1673), a Dutch Golden Age painter, draughtsman and architect
 Philips Angel I (1616–1683), a Dutch still-life painter
 Ariana Nozeman (1626/1628 – 1661), the first actress in The Netherlands
 Pieter Borsseler (ca.1633 – ca.1687), a Dutch portrait painter, prominent in England
 Pieter Bustijn (1649–1729), a composer, organist, harpsichordist and carillon player
 Adriaen Coorte (ca.1665 – ca.1707), a Dutch Golden Age painter of still-lifes
 Barend Cornelis Koekkoek (1803–1862), a Dutch landscape artist and lithographer
 Suzanna Sablairolles (1829–1867), a Dutch stage actress
 Anna Adelaïde Abrahams (1849–1930), a Dutch still life painter
 Henri Eduard Beunke (1851–1925), a Dutch writer, known for his literary regionalistic work
 Herman Johannes van der Weele (1852–1930), a Dutch painter of the 2nd Hague School
 Pieter Cornelis Boutens (1870–1943), a Dutch poet, classicist, and mystic
 Joost Baljeu (1925–1991), a Dutch painter, sculptor and writer
 Paul van der Feen (born 1978), a Dutch saxophonist
 Carolyn Lilipaly (born 1969), a Dutch news anchor and actress
 Stefan de Vries (born 1970), a Dutch writer and journalist

Public thinking and public service 
 Paul of Middelburg (1446–1534), a Flemish scientist and Bishop of Fossombrone 
 Philippe van Lansberge (1561–1632), a Dutch Calvinist Minister, astronomer and mathematician
 John Forbes (c.1568–1634) founded a Church of Scotland
 Isaac Beeckman (1588–1637), a Dutch philosopher and scientist
 Sir Balthazar Gerbier (1592–1663), an Anglo-Dutch courtier, diplomat, art advisor, miniaturist and architectural designer
 Paulus van de Perre (ca.1598 – 1653 in London), a Dutch politician and diplomat, negotiated with Oliver Cromwell
 Adam Boreel (1602–1665), a Dutch theologian and Hebrew scholar
 Margaretha Sandra (1629–1674), a Dutch military heroine in the siege of Aardenburg in 1672 
 Frederik van Leenhof (1647–1715), a controversial Dutch pastor and philosopher 
 Adrian Beverland (1650 — 1716 in London), a Dutch humanist scholar, banished in 1679 and settled in England
 Cornelius van Bynkershoek (1673–1743), a Dutch jurist and legal theorist   
 Stephanus Versluys (1694–1736), the 21st Governor of Dutch Ceylon
 Reynier de Klerck (1710–1780), Governor-General of the Dutch East Indies 1778/1780
 Laurens Pieter van de Spiegel (1736–1800) was Grand Pensionary of Zeeland
 Piet Meertens (1899–1985), a Dutch scholar of literature, dialects, and ethnology
 Etty Hillesum (1914 – 1943 in Auschwitz), the Dutch author of confessional letters and diaries
 Hendricus Leopold (1918–2008), a Dutch diplomat, first Ambassador of the Netherlands to Suriname
 Albert de Vries (born 1955), a Dutch politician, alderman of Middelburg 2002/2012
 Han Polman (born 1963), a Dutch politician, King's Commissioner of Zeeland since 2013
 Harald Bergmann (born 1965), a Dutch politician, Mayor of Middelburg since 2012

Science and business 
 Zacharias Janssen (1585 – ca.1632), a Dutch spectacle-maker, lived mostly in Middelburg.
 Alexander Daniell (1599–1668), the sole proprietor of the Manor of Alverton, Cornwall 1630/1668 
 Pieter van Abeele (1608–1684), a medallist, perfected the technique of pressing hollow medals
 Jan Goedart (1617–1668), a Dutch naturalist, entomologist and painter
 Steven Blankaart (1650–1704), a Dutch physician, iatrochemist, and entomologist
 Pieter Boddaert (1730–1795), a Dutch physician and naturalist
 Franz Zacharias Ermerins (1808–1871), a Dutch physician and medical editor
 Jan Adrianus Herklots (1820–1872), a Dutch zoologist, researched carcinology and the echinoderms
 Cecil Hoare FRS (1892–1984), a British protozoologist and parasitologist 
 Lili Bleeker (1897–1985), a Dutch entrepreneur and physicist, designed and made optical instruments
 Cees Maas (born 1947), former chief financial officer of the ING Group

Sport 
 Jan Poortvliet (born 1955), a retired football defender with 531 club caps
 Elisabeth Willeboordse (born 1978), a female judoka, bronze medallist at the 2008 Summer Olympics

Geography and climate

Aside from the town of Middelburg, the municipality also includes several population centres, including: Arnemuiden, Kleverskerke, Nieuw- en Sint Joosland and Sint Laurens.
The town is close to the coast but the distance of 10–15 km means the winters are somewhat colder with especially lower winter minima and higher summer maxima. It has a temperate oceanic climate (Cfb) with few extremes. Winters tend to be mild, especially considering the northern latitude, summers are cool and precipitation is spread out evenly over the year. All seasons are warming up by about 0,5 C/decade due to anthropogenic warming.
The extremes measured since 2000, 2 km northeast of the town in the countryside with calibrated equipment have been -17,2 C on the 4th of February 2012 and 40,9 C on the 25th of July 2019, the latter unofficially being a new Dutch all-time high record, slightly above the 40,7 C measured at Gilzerijen KNMI and 40,6 C in Westdorpe. Vlissingen KNMI measured -11,0 C and 37,5 C on the same dates, clearly showing how much the influence is diminished just 8 km further inland.
The climate is warming due to anthropogenic influences, clearly witnessed by the fact that the previous record of 37,5 C was measured just a year before. Also, in the past minima have been at and probably below -20 C in winter months. Snowcover, days with airfrost and icedays (Tx < 0,0 C) have greatly diminished and with it ice speedskating on the canals, a favourite sport in the winter months, has become very infrequent since 2013 especially.

Gallery

Culture and recreation
When William of Orange decided to found the first university in the Netherlands in 1575, he initially considered locating it in Middelburg. Ultimately he chose Leiden, however, and Middelburg—as well as all of Zeeland—remained without a university until 2004 when University College Roosevelt (formerly known as Roosevelt Academy), affiliated with Utrecht University, was established. A campus of the HZ University of Applied Sciences is also located in the city, although this institution has its headquarters in the nearby city of Vlissingen.

Cultural institutions

Theaters and Concert halls

Sightseeing

Sports
Middelburg has a rugby club, Oemoemenoe, and four football (soccer) clubs: MZVC, Zeelandia Middelburg, Jong Ambon and FC Dauwendaele. Jong Ambon is translated Young Ambon, and consists of mostly Ambonese players. FC Dauwendaele is the main club in Dauwendaele.

Transportation

Middelburg has a railway station with intercity train connections to Vlissingen, Goes, Roosendaal, Rotterdam, The Hague, Leiden, Haarlem, and Amsterdam. Four trains leave every hour in both directions.

Twin cities

In popular culture
 In Rafael Sabatini's 1929 novel "The Romantic Prince", set in the late 1460s, Middelburg is the home town of Mister Danvelt and his son Philip. The Danvelt home is a beautiful, gabled house on the Lange Delft, not far from Middelburg's imposing abbey. Philip Danvelt inherits the house and lives there with his wife Johanna when he is arrested by Lord Claude de Rhynsault.
In The Canterbury  Tales, c.1387, the Merchant speaks of the absolute importance of keeping the sea free of pirates "between Middelburg and Orwell" (the River Orwell in England).

References

Literature

External links

 

Official city website (in Dutch with a limited English section)
Tourism Middelburg

 
Cities in the Netherlands
Municipalities of Zeeland
Populated places in Zeeland
Provincial capitals of the Netherlands
Walcheren